Ion Bucan (born Pașcani, 27 January 1955), is a Romanian former rugby union player. He played as prop.

Career
He first played in 1970, for Politehnica Iași, where he played until 1978, when he started to play for Știința Petroșani in the championship. Bucan later moved for Dinamo București in 1984. He debuted for Romania on  21 September 1976, against Bulgaria, in Burgas, during the 1976-77 FIRA Trophy. Bucan was also part of the Romania squad for the 1987 Rugby World Cup, where he played all three matches in the tournament. His last cap was against France, on 11 November 1987, in Agen.

Honours
Știința Petroșani
Cupa României: 1983

Dinamo București
Cupa României: 1989

Romania
FIRA Trophy: 1976-77, 1980-81 and 1982-83

References

External links
Ion Bucan international stats

1955 births
Living people
Romanian rugby union players
Romania international rugby union players
CS Dinamo București (rugby union) players
Rugby union props
People from Pașcani
Gheorghe Asachi Technical University of Iași alumni